Fragaria viridis, commonly called creamy strawberry or green strawberry is a species of strawberry native to Europe and central Asia.  It has fruits with fine flavour. They have surprisingly little of the usual strawberry aroma, but a refreshing acidity, and sometimes ripen without becoming red. When they are plucked from the plant, the calyx will usually adhere and they will detach with a noticeable snapping sound.

All strawberries have a base haploid count of 7 chromosomes. Fragaria viridis is diploid, having 2 pairs of these chromosomes for a total of 14 chromosomes. Fragaria viridis is approximately 6,24 million years old.

Gallery

See also
 Wild strawberry
 Musk strawberry
 Strawberry

References

External links

 Den Virtuella Floran Swedish site with good F. viridis photos.
 

viridis